Cape Verde had been a Portuguese colony for more than 500 years since 1456. In 1974 Portugal and the Cape Verdeans signed an agreement to form a transitional government, and Cape Verde gained full independence from Portugal on July 5, 1975.

The United States recognized Cape Verde and commissioned its first ambassador Melissa F. Wells in 1976. Ambassador Wells was concurrently accredited to Guinea-Bissau and Cape Verde while resident at Bissau, the capital of Guinea-Bissau. In 1980, an embassy was established in the capital Praia with a chargé d’affaires managing the business of the embassy. Until 1980 one ambassador, resident at Bissau, was concurrently commissioned to Guinea-Bissau and Cape Verde.

Ambassadors

See also
Embassy of Cape Verde in Washington, D.C.
Cape Verde – United States relations
Foreign relations of Cape Verde
Ambassadors from the United States

References
U.S. Department of State: Background Notes on Cape Verde

External links
 United States Department of State: Chiefs of Mission for Cape Verde
 United States Department of State: Cape Verde
 United States Embassy in Praia

Cape Verde diplomacy-related lists
Cape Verde